Eichstätt Cathedral, properly known as the Cathedral Church of the Blessed Virgin Mary, St. Willibald and St. Salvator is an 11th-Century Roman Catholic cathedral in the city of Eichstätt, Bavaria, in Southern Germany.

History
The first Roman Catholic cathedral of Our Lady and Sts. Willibald and Salvator in Eichstätt was built in the 8th century. Together with the cloister and the mortuary, the two-aisled cathedral is regarded as one of the most important medieval monuments in Bavaria.

Bells

The cathedral has a collection of 18 bells, making it one of the churches with the most bells in Germany. The bells - distributed between the north and south tower - are not rung together, but rung in four separate groups.

Main Peal
The oldest bell in the peal is dedicated to Mary, mother of Jesus, and dates from the beginning of the 14th Century. The bell named Hallerin was cast by Nuremberg master Hans Glockengießer in 1540. The Magnificat bell of 1975 is also known as the Bishop's Bell. The Benedict Bell was donated by church musician Wolfram Menschick.

North Tower

South Tower
The two bells of 1256 have a very characteristic sound, resulting from their special rib bell shape. Two bells are rung for weekday vespers, one bell each for rosary devotions, and every Friday at 11 o'clock for the Passion of Christ.

Death Bell
In the North Tower is the Death Bell, known as Klag, which is only rung to commemorate the death of a member of the cathedral community. It was probably cast by Hermann Kessler at the beginning of the 14th century and has a strike tone of a″ +1/16.

Museum 
Attached to the cathedral is a museum named Cathedral Treasury and Diocesan Museum.

Burials
St Willibald's tomb
Joseph Schröffer

References

Buildings and structures in Eichstätt (district)
Roman Catholic cathedrals in Bavaria
Eichstätt